Constantino Zaballa Gutiérrez (born 15 May 1978 in La Hayuela, Cantabria, Spain) is a Spanish former professional road racing cyclist, best known for winning Clásica de San Sebastián in 2005. Towards the end of his career, Zaballa ventured into cyclocross with the Club Ciclistica Udías.

Major results

2001
 1st Stage 8 Tour de l'Avenir
 1st Stage 1 Volta a Portugal
2003
 3rd Circuito de Getxo
2004
 1st Stage 19 Vuelta a España
 1st Stage 3 Vuelta a Aragón
 2nd Circuito de Getxo
2005
 1st Clásica de San Sebastián
 3rd Overall Paris-Nice
2007
 1st Overall Euskal Bizikleta
1st Stage 3
2008
 2nd Overall GP Internacional Paredes Rota dos Móveis
1st Stage 3
2009
 2nd Road race, National Road Championships
2010
 1st Overall Vuelta a Asturias
1st Stage 5
2011
  2nd Overall Vuelta a Asturias 
 1st Points classification 
 1st Stage 5 
2013
 1st Overall Tour de Tipaza
1st Stage 1
 1st Destination Thy
 2nd Overall Tour of China I
 3rd Overall Tour de Korea
 3rd Overall Sibiu Cycling Tour
 4th Overall Tour d'Algérie
 4th Overall Tour de Blida
 4th Circuit d'Alger

External links

1978 births
Living people
Doping cases in cycling
Spanish sportspeople in doping cases
Cyclists from Cantabria
Spanish male cyclists
Spanish Vuelta a España stage winners
People from the Western Coast of Cantabria